Sunday Concert is Canadian singer Gordon Lightfoot's first live album and fifth album overall, released in 1969 on the United Artists label. Lightfoot's last recording for United Artists, it was also his first live album and until the release of a live DVD in 2002 remained Lightfoot's only officially released live recording. The album was recorded at Massey Hall in Toronto.

The album is notable as it includes performances of five previously unreleased tracks. It also contains the first recording of Lightfoot's hits "I'm Not Sayin'" and "Ribbon of Darkness" together as a medley. This medley would later feature on Gord's Gold and would become a concert staple. "Ballad of Yarmouth Castle" chronicles the fate of the SS Yarmouth Castle which caught fire and sank off the Bahamas in November, 1965.

A 1993 CD reissue on Bear Family Records includes five studio recordings as bonus tracks.

Reception

In his Allmusic review, critic Richie Unterberger praised the album, writing "These then-new songs aren't among his classics, but are up to the general high standard of his '60s work, with the socially conscious "The Lost Children" and the poetic "Leaves of Grass" standing out as lyrical highlights."

Track listing
All compositions by Gordon Lightfoot, except as noted.

Side 1
 "In a Windowpane" – 3:11
 "The Lost Children" – 2:47
 "Leaves of Grass" – 3:43
 "I'm Not Sayin'/Ribbon of Darkness" – 2:54
 "Apology" – 4:33
 "Bitter Green" – 2:43

Side 2
 "Ballad of Yarmouth Castle" – 5:18
 "Softly" – 3:16
 "Boss Man" – 2:26
 "Pussy Willows, Cat-Tails" – 2:53
 "Canadian Railroad Trilogy" – 6:41

Bonus tracks on Bear Family release
 "Just Like Tom Thumb's Blues" (Bob Dylan)
 "Movin', No 1"
 "I'll Be Alright"
 "Spin, Spin"
 "Movin', No 2"

Personnel
 Gordon Lightfoot - vocals, acoustic guitar, piano, 
 Red Shea - lead guitar
 Rick Haynes - bass
Technical
Elliot Mazer - producer
Lee Hulko - mastering engineer
Adam Mitchell - production assistant 
Bob Cato - design
Jim Marshall - photography

References

External links
Album lyrics and chords

Gordon Lightfoot albums
1969 live albums
Albums produced by Elliot Mazer
United Artists Records live albums
Albums recorded at Massey Hall
Bear Family Records albums
Music of Toronto